Albert C. Sauter   (September 2, 1868 – July 15, 1928) was a Major League Baseball infielder.

External links

Major League Baseball third basemen
Philadelphia Athletics (AA) players
Baseball players from Pennsylvania
1868 births
1928 deaths
Allentown (minor league baseball) players
Lancaster (minor league baseball) players
Wilmington Blue Hens players
Reading Actives players
19th-century baseball players